Wichrowiec  is a village in the administrative district of Gmina Janowo, within Nidzica County, Warmian-Masurian Voivodeship, in northern Poland.

The village has a population of 360.

Notable residents
 Fritz Maxin (1885–1960), politician

References

Wichrowiec